Hugh Boyle may refer to:

Hugh Charles Boyle (1873–1950), American Roman Catholic bishop
Hugh Boyle (golfer) (1936–2015), Irish golfer
Hugh Boyle (trade unionist) (1850–1907), British trade unionist
Hugh Boyle Ewing (1826–1905), American diplomat, author and lawyer
Hugh Boyle (bishop) (1897–1986), Bishop of Johannesburg